Justin Brathwaite (born 3 February 1988) is a Barbadian cricketer. He played in six Twenty20 matches for the Barbados cricket team in 2013.

See also
 List of Barbadian representative cricketers

References

External links
 

1988 births
Living people
Barbadian cricketers
Barbados cricketers
Cricketers from Bridgetown